Valambray is a commune in the department of Calvados, northwestern France. The municipality was established on 1 January 2017 by merger of the former communes of Airan (the seat), Billy, Conteville, Fierville-Bray and Poussy-la-Campagne.

See also 
Communes of the Calvados department

References 

Communes of Calvados (department)
Populated places established in 2017
2017 establishments in France